John Braithwaite (born 30 July 1951, Ipswich) is a Distinguished Professor at the Australian National University (ANU).  Braithwaite is the recipient of a number of international awards and prizes for his work, including an honorary doctorate at KU Leuven (2008), the University of Louisville Grawemeyer Award with Peter Drahos for Ideas Improving World Order (2004), and the Prix Emile Durkheim, International Society of Criminology, for lifetime contributions to criminology (2005).

His writings on regulatory capitalism have influenced regulatory scholars in other countries, such as Canadian political scientists G. Bruce Doern, Michael J. Prince and Richard Shultz.

Career
As a criminologist, he is particularly interested in the role of restorative justice, shame management and reintegration in crime prevention.
His book Crime, Shame and Reintegration (1989) demonstrated that current criminal justice practice tends to stigmatize offenders, making the crime problem worse. Braithwaite argues that restorative justice enables both offenders and citizens, by way of mediation, to repair the social harm caused by crime.  He has also worked with Philip Pettit on the application of republican theory to criminal law and regulation.

Braithwaite’s other contributions include the development and application of responsive regulation frameworks and restorative justice to many areas of business regulation, health care and aged care. He is the founder of the School of Regulation and Global Governance (RegNet, formerly the Regulatory Institutions Network), a large interdisciplinary research group within the College of Asia and the Pacific at the Australian National University, working on complex issues of regulation and governance. He is a former Australian Research Council (ARC) Federation Fellow at RegNet.

He is further exploring ideas related to restorative justice and responsive regulation in the 20-year comparative project called Peacebuilding Compared, an ambitious study comparing peacebuilding efforts in 48 conflicts throughout the world.

One of his recent books, Anomie and Violence: Non-truth and Reconciliation in Indonesian Peacebuilding, found that peacebuilding in Papua, Maluku and North Maluku, Central Sulawesi, West Kalimantan and Central Kalimantan, and Aceh was largely achieved through non-truth and reconciliation.

Works
J. Braithwaite, V. Braithwaite, M. Cookson & L. Dunn (2010). Anomie and Violence: Non-truth and Reconciliation in Indonesian Peacebuilding, Canberra: ANU E-Press, 2010. 
J. Braithwaite (2008). Regulatory Capitalism: How it Works, Ideas for Making it Work Better, Cheltenham: Edward Elgar. 
J. Braithwaite, T. Makai & V. Braithwaite (2007). Regulating Aged Care: Ritualism and the New Pyramid, Cheltenham: Edward Elgar.
J. Braithwaite (2002). Restorative Justice and Responsive Regulation, New York: Oxford University Press. 
P. Drahos and J. Braithwaite (2002).Information Feudalism: Who Owns the Knowledge Economy New York: Routledge 
E. Ahmed, N. Harris, J. Braithwaite & V. Braithwaite (2001). Shame management through Reintegration, Melbourne: Cambridge University Press.
J. Braithwaite & P. Drahos (2001). Global Business Regulation, Cambridge University Press. 
J. Braithwaite & P. Pettit (1990). Not Just Deserts: A Republican Theory of Criminal Justice, Oxford University Press.
J. Braithwaite, Crime, Shame and Reintegration, Cambridge: Cambridge University Press, 1989. 
J. Braithwaite (1984). Corporate Crime in the Pharmaceutical Industry, London: Routledge & Kegan Paul.

References

External links

Academic staff of the Australian National University
Australian National University alumni
Australian criminologists
Living people
1951 births
Winners of the Stockholm Prize in Criminology